Phyllis Ada Diller (née Driver; July 17, 1917 – August 20, 2012) was an American stand-up comedian, actress, author, musician, and visual artist, best known for her eccentric stage persona, self-deprecating humor, wild hair and clothes, and exaggerated, cackling laugh.

Diller was one of the first female comics to become a household name in the U.S., credited as an influence by Joan Rivers, Roseanne Barr, and Ellen DeGeneres, among others. She had a large gay following and is considered a gay icon. She was also one of the first celebrities to openly champion plastic surgery, for which she was recognized by the cosmetic surgery industry.

Diller contributed to more than 40 films, beginning with 1961's Splendor in the Grass. She appeared in many television series, featuring in numerous cameos as well as her own short-lived sitcom and variety show. Some of her credits include Night Gallery, The Muppet Show, The Love Boat, Cybill, and Boston Legal, plus 11 seasons of The Bold and the Beautiful. Her voice-acting roles included the monster's wife in Mad Monster Party, the Queen in A Bug's Life, Granny Neutron in The Adventures of Jimmy Neutron: Boy Genius, and Thelma Griffin in Family Guy.

Early life
Diller was born Phyllis Ada Driver in Lima, Ohio on July 17, 1917, the only child of Perry Marcus Driver, an insurance agent, and Frances Ada (née Romshe). She had German and Irish ancestry (the surname "Driver" had been changed from "Treiber" several generations earlier). She was raised Methodist but later became an atheist. Her father and mother were older than most when she was born (55 and 36, respectively) and Diller attended several funerals while growing up. The exposure to death at a young age led her to an early appreciation for life and she later realized that her comedy was a form of therapy.

She attended Lima's Central High School and discovered she had the gift of humor early on. Although she wasn't a class clown, calling herself a "quiet and dedicated" student, she enjoyed making people laugh once school was out. Diller studied piano for three years at the Sherwood Music Conservatory of Columbia College Chicago but decided against a music career and transferred to Bluffton College where she studied literature, history, psychology, and philosophy. She met Sherwood Diller at Bluffton and they married in 1939. Diller did not finish school and was primarily a housewife, taking care of their five children (a sixth child died in infancy).

Career

1950s
After moving to Alameda, California, Diller began working in broadcasting in 1952 at KROW radio in Oakland, California. In November of that year, she filmed several 15-minute segments for the Bay Area television series Phyllis Dillis, the Homely Friendmaker—dressed in a housecoat to offer absurd "advice" to homemakers. Diller also worked as a copywriter at KSFO radio in San Francisco and a vocalist for a music-review TV show called Pop Club, hosted by Don Sherwood.

With the encouragement of her husband, Diller made her debut as a stand-up comedian at age 37 in the basement of the San Francisco North Beach club, The Purple Onion, on March 7, 1955. Up until then, she had only tried out her jokes for fellow PTA members at nearby Edison Elementary School. Maya Angelou, who was already performing at the club, wrote that Diller “would not change her name because when she became successful she wanted everyone to know it was, indeed, her herself”. Her first professional show was a success and the two-week booking stretched out to 89 consecutive weeks. Diller had found her calling and eventual financial success while her husband's business career failed. She explained, "I became a stand-up comedian because I had a sit-down husband."

In a 1986 NPR interview, Diller said she had no idea what she was doing when she started playing clubs and in the beginning, she never saw another woman on the comedy circuit. With no female role models in a male-dominated industry, she initially used props and drew from her educational and work background as a basis for satire, spoofing classical music concerts and advice columns. She wrote her own material and kept a file cabinet full of her gags, honing her nightclub act. Sid Caesar, Milton Berle, and Jonathan Winters were early influences, but Diller developed a singular comedic persona — a surreal version of femininity. This absurd caricature with garish baggy dresses and gigantic, clownish hair made fun of her lack of sex appeal while brandishing a cigarette holder (with a wooden cigarette because she didn't smoke), punctuating the humor with a hearty cackle to show she was in on the joke. At the time, Diller said, "They had no idea what I was. It was like—'Get a stick and kill it before it multiplies!'"

Her first national television appearance was as a contestant on Groucho Marx's quiz show You Bet Your Life in 1958. Multiple bookings on the Jack Paar Tonight Show led to an appearance on The Ed Sullivan Show, which brought her national prominence as she continued to perform stand-up throughout the U.S.

Starting in 1959 and throughout the 1960s, she released multiple comedy albums, including the titles Wet Toe in a Hot Socket!, Laughs, Are You Ready for Phyllis Diller?, and The Beautiful Phyllis Diller.

1960s

In the early '60s, Diller performed at the Bon Soir in Greenwich Village, where an up-and-coming Barbra Streisand was her opening act. She was offered film work and became famous after co-starring with her mentor Bob Hope, who described her as "a Warhol mobile of spare parts picked up along a freeway." They worked together in films such as Boy, Did I Get a Wrong Number!, Eight on the Lam, and The Private Navy of Sgt. O'Farrell, all critically panned, but Boy... did well at the box office. Diller accompanied Hope to Vietnam in 1966 with his USO troupe near the height of the Vietnam War.

She appeared regularly as a special guest on many television programs, including The Andy Williams Show"; What's My Line? Mystery Guests. The blindfolded panel on that evening's broadcast included Sammy Davis, Jr., and they were able to discern Diller's identity in three guesses. Diller made regular cameo appearances, making her trademark wisecracks on Rowan and Martin's Laugh-In. Self-deprecating to a fault, a typical Diller joke had her running after a garbage truck pulling away from her curb. "Am I too late for the trash?" she'd yell. The driver's reply: "No, jump right in!" She became a semi-regular on The Hollywood Squares, starting in 1967, appearing in 28 episodes until 1980.

Diller continued to work in film, making an appearance as Texas Guinan, the wisecracking nightclub hostess in Splendor in the Grass. Throughout the 1960s, she appeared in more than a dozen, usually low-budget, films. She also began a career in voice work, providing the voice of the Monster's Mate in Mad Monster Party (1967).

Diller also starred in the short-lived TV series The Pruitts of Southampton (1966–1967); later retitled The Phyllis Diller Show, a half-hour sitcom on ABC. She received a Golden Globe nomination in 1967 for her role in Pruitts. Diller hosted a variety show in 1968 titled The Beautiful Phyllis Diller Show.

Beginning December 26, 1969, she had a three-month run in Hello, Dolly! (opposite Richard Deacon), as the second to last in a succession of replacements for Carol Channing in the title role, which included Ginger Rogers, Martha Raye, Betty Grable, and Pearl Bailey. After Diller's stint, Ethel Merman took over the role until the end of the show's run in December 1970.

1970–2012

Diller continued working in television throughout the '70s and '80s, appearing as a judge on premiere and subsequent episodes of The Gong Show and as a panelist on the Match Game PM show.  She also guest-starred in The Mouse Factory, Night Gallery, Love American Style, The Muppet Show, CHiPs and The Love Boat. Between 1999 and 2003 she played roles in 7th Heaven and The Drew Carey Show.

Her successful career as a voice actor continued when Diller guested as herself in "A Good Medium is Rare," a 1972 episode of The New Scooby-Doo Movies. In 1998, Diller provided the voice of the Queen in A Bug's Life. Among her other animated films are The Nutcracker Prince (1990, as Mousequeen), Happily Ever After (1990, as Mother Nature), and Casper's Scare School (2006, as Aunt Spitzy).

She voiced characters in several television series, including Robot Chicken, Family Guy,  Wait Till Your Father Gets Home, Captain Planet, Cow and Chicken, Hey Arnold! as Arnold's grandpa's sister Mitzi, The Powerpuff Girls, Animaniacs, Jimmy Neutron as Jimmy's grandmother, The Wild Thornberrys, and King of the Hill. She also played Peter Griffin's mother, Thelma, on Family Guy in 2006.

Retirement
Citing advanced age and a lack of "lasting energy," Diller retired from stand-up in 2002. Her final performance was at the Suncoast that year in Las Vegas, Nevada. At the time she stated, "If you can't dance to comedy, forget it. It's music." The 2004 documentary Goodnight, We Love You: The Life and Legend of Phyllis Diller, directed by Gregg Barson, was shot on the night of her last performance. It follows Diller to a press conference, backstage, and into her home, to cover the story of her career. Rip Taylor, Don Rickles, Roseanne Barr, Red Buttons, Jo Anne Worley and Lily Tomlin are featured, discussing Diller's comedy legacy.

Although retired from the stand-up circuit, Diller never fully left the entertainment industry. In 2005, she was featured as one of many contemporary comics in The Aristocrats. Diller, who avoided blue comedy, did a version of an old, risqué vaudeville routine, in which she describes herself passing out when she first heard the joke, forgetting the actual content of the joke.

On January 24, 2007, Diller appeared on The Tonight Show and performed stand-up before chatting with Jay Leno. Leno has stated that Diller would infrequently call him to contribute jokes during his time as the host of The Tonight Show. The same year she had a cameo appearance portraying herself in an episode of Boston Legal. In 2011, she appeared in an episode of her friend Roseanne Barr's reality show Roseanne's Nuts.

In January 2012, she recorded a version of Charlie Chaplin's song "Smile" with Pink Martini's Thomas Lauderdale for the album Get Happy.

Author

Publishing her first best seller in 1966 and releasing more throughout the decade, Diller's books on domestic life featured her self-deprecating humor. The titles include Phyllis Diller's Housekeeping Hints, Phyllis Diller's Marriage Manual, and The Complete Mother. In 1981 she published The Joys of Aging & How to Avoid Them.

Her autobiography, Like a Lampshade in a Whorehouse – My Life in Comedy, co-written with Richard Buskin, was published in 2006. In it, Diller told of an unhappy childhood with undemonstrative, emotionally withholding parents, and an equally unhappy first marriage. From these beginnings, her performing style—telling rapid-fire jokes—emerged, which she compared to music: "One joke followed the other with a flow and a rhythm. ... Everything had a natural feel to it."

In the early 1990s, Diller had many short, humorous pieces published in Ellery Queen's Mystery Magazine.

Musician
Diller had studied the piano for many years and was an accomplished player but decided against a career in music after hearing her teachers and mentors play with much more skill than she thought that she would be able to achieve. She still played in her private life, however, and owned a custom-made harpsichord.

Between 1971 and 1981, Diller appeared as a piano soloist with symphony orchestras across the country under the stage name Dame Illya Dillya. Her performances were spiced with humor, but she took the music seriously. A review of one of her concerts in The San Francisco Examiner called her "a fine concert pianist with a firm touch."

Artist
Diller, a self-taught artist, began painting in 1963. She worked in acrylics, watercolors, and oils throughout the 1970s and filled her Brentwood, California home with her portraits and still lifes. In 2003, at age 86, she held the first of several "art parties," selling her artwork along with her stage clothes and costume jewelry.

Personal life
Diller credited much of her success to a motivational book, The Magic of Believing (1948) by Claude M. Bristol, which gave her confidence at the start of her career. She was married and divorced twice. She had six children from her marriage with her first husband Sherwood Anderson Diller, and she outlived two of her grown children.

Diller's second husband was actor Warde Donovan, whom she married on October 7, 1965. She filed for divorce three months later, having found him to be bisexual and alcoholic, though they reconciled on the day before the divorce was to become final. She divorced him in 1975. Robert P. Hastings was her partner from 1985 until his death on May 23, 1996. In a 2000 interview, she called him the love of her life, saying that he admired her for being an independent person.

The character of "Fang," the husband, who she frequently mentioned in her act, sprang from an appropriation of elements of the comic strip The Lockhorns. Diller portrayed herself as a horrible cook in her stand-up routines, but she was reputed to be an excellent cook. She licensed her recipe for chili and sold it nationally as "Phyllis Diller Chili". Diller candidly discussed her plastic surgery, a series of procedures first undertaken when she was 55, and she wrote that she had undergone 15 procedures. Her numerous surgeries were the subject of a 20/20 segment  on February 12, 1993.

Illness and death
By 1997, as she passed her 80th birthday, Diller began to suffer from various ailments. In 1999, her heart stopped during a hospital stay. She was fitted with a pacemaker but had a bad drug reaction and became paralyzed. Through physical therapy, she was able to walk again. Approaching age 90, Diller retired from stand-up comedy appearances.

On July 11, 2007, USA Today reported that she had fractured her back and had to cancel an appearance on The Tonight Show, during which she had planned to celebrate her 90th birthday. On May 15, 2012, Diller conducted her final interview accepting the “Lifetime Achievement” award from her hometown of Lima, Ohio, as part of a panel of comedians.

Diller died at her home in the Brentwood neighborhood of Los Angeles on the morning of August 20, 2012, at the age of 95. She was cremated, and her ashes were scattered at sea.

Influence and legacy

Diller was one of the first solo female comedians in the U.S. to become a household name. She stated that making people laugh is a powerful art form. As a pioneering woman in the stand-up field, she inspired many female comedians including Joan Rivers, Lily Tomlin, Ellen DeGeneres, Margaret Cho and Roseanne Barr. Diller herself was influenced by comedy books and appropriated from sources like The Lockhorns.

Barr, who listened to Diller's records as a child, called her a true artist and revolutionary, saying, "It was timeless, that wacky, tacky character she created; the cigarette holder was genius, paradoxically regal. She was a victorious loser hero, the female iteration of Chaplin's Little Tramp."

Fellow comic Joan Rivers paid tribute to Diller's early-career woman's point of view, saying, "She was the first one that there was such rage and such anger in her comedy. She had the anger that is now in all of us. And that's what made it so funny because she spoke for all these women that were sitting home with five children and a husband that didn't work."

Diller had a large gay following from the beginning of her career, once saying, "My first audience were gay people because they have a great sense of humor." An obituary in Queerty noted her popularity with gay audiences calling her a "strong-willed entertainer who challenged the status quo regarding gender and sexuality." She enjoyed the company of gay men, writing in her memoir, Like a Lampshade in a Whorehouse: My Life in Comedy: "Gay men have the most wonderful sense of humor. And they are willing to laugh. They appeal to me and I appeal to them." In 2021, Ginger Minj portrayed Diller in the Snatch Game of Love on the sixth season of RuPaul's Drag Race All Stars.

A New York Times remembrance noted that Diller's flamboyant look is echoed in Lady Gaga's concert attire and that Eddie Murphy also punctuated jokes with a loud laugh, in a style reminiscent of Diller's persona.

Diller was an outspoken proponent of plastic surgery at a time when cosmetic procedures were secretive. Her public admission to having several facelifts, nose jobs and other procedures added promotional and comedic value to her act. She told Bob Hope in 1971 that she had had a facelift because "I got sick and tired of having the dog drag me out to the yard and bury me." The American Academy of Cosmetic Surgery gave her an award for bringing plastic surgery "out of the closet."

In 2003, after hearing of the donation of Archie Bunker's chair to the Smithsonian Institution, Diller opened her doors to the National Museum of American History. She offered them some of her most iconic costume pieces, as well as her gag file, a steel cabinet with 48 file drawers with more than 50,000 jokes she had written on index cards during her career. In 2011, the Albert H. Small Documents Gallery at the National Museum of American History displayed Diller's file and some of the objects that became synonymous with her comedic persona—an unkempt wig, wrist-length gloves, cloth-covered ankle boots, and a bejeweled cigarette holder.

Awards and honors
 Golden Apple Award for Most Cooperative Actress – 1966.
 Laurel Award for Female New Face 11th place – 1967.
 Golden Globe nomination for Actress in a Television Series – The Pruitts of Southampton – 1967.
 Awarded Star on the Hollywood Walk of Fame for her contribution to Television – January 15, 1975.
 Women's International Center Living Legacy Award – 1990.
 American Comedy Award for Lifetime Achievement – 1992.
 Diller lived in St. Louis with her family from 1961 to 1965 and was inducted into the St. Louis Walk of Fame in 1993.
 Daytime Emmy Award nomination for Outstanding Service Show Host – A Tribute to Bob Hope – 1998.
 Women in Film Lucy Award, recognizing her achievements in enhancing the perception of women through the medium of television – 2000.
 San Diego Film Festival Governor's Award – 2004.
 Lifetime Achievement Award from hometown Lima, Ohio – 2012.
 Diller's July 17 birthday is officially "Phyllis Diller Day" in Alameda, California, where she got her start in radio and television.

Filmography

Film

Television

References

External links

 
 
 
 
 Phyllis Diller's TV Debut with Groucho Marx video, 13 min.
  video, 6 min.
 NPR interview, Phyllis Diller: Still Out for a Laugh
 Diller Interview Comedy Hall of Fame, Archives, 2006
 NPR: Not My Job: Phyllis Diller August 4, 2007, on Wait Wait...Don't Tell Me!
 

1917 births
2012 deaths
20th-century American comedians
21st-century American comedians
20th-century American actresses
21st-century American actresses
20th-century atheists
21st-century atheists
Actresses from Los Angeles
Actresses from Ohio
Former Methodists
American atheists
American film actresses
American people of German descent
American people of Irish descent
American stage actresses
American stand-up comedians
American television actresses
American voice actresses
American women comedians
American women writers
Bluffton University alumni
People from Lima, Ohio
Writers from Ohio
People from Brentwood, Los Angeles
Comedians from California
Las Vegas shows
Verve Records artists
United Service Organizations entertainers